Nordbrücke (German for North Bridge) may refer to:
Nordbrücke, a bridge in Kaiserbrücke, Mainz, Germany
Theodor Heuss Bridge (Düsseldorf), a bridge over the Rhine River in Düsseldorf built in the 1950s
Nordbrücke, a bowstring arch bridge in Marktheidenfeld, Bavaria, Germany
 Nordbrücke (Vienna) (de) - see Transportation in Vienna

See also
 Northbridge (disambiguation)